Simunye is a town in Eswatini. Simunye may also refer to:
Zulu for "We are one".
Simunye Park, a stadium in Simunye, Eswatini.
Simunye is a short story by Piper Dellums which was made into the movie The Color of Friendship